Berdimuhamedow is a surname. Notable people with the name include:

 Gurbanguly Berdimuhamedow (born 1957), Turkmen politician; President of Turkmenistan (2007–2022)
 Serdar Berdimuhamedow (born 1981), Turkmen politician; President of Turkmenistan (2022–present); son of Gurbanguly